In Vietnamese cuisine,  or banh mi ("bread") is a short baguette with thin, crisp crust and soft, airy texture. It is often split lengthwise and filled with savory ingredients like a submarine sandwich and served as a meal, called bánh mì thịt.  Plain banh mi is also eaten as a staple food.

A typical Vietnamese roll or sandwich is a fusion of meats and vegetables from native Vietnamese cuisine such as chả lụa (pork sausage), coriander leaf (cilantro), cucumber, pickled carrots, and pickled daikon combined with condiments from French cuisine such as pâté, along with red chili and buttery mayonnaise. In Vietnam, bread rolls and sandwiches are typically eaten for breakfast or as a snack.

The baguette was introduced to Vietnam by the French in the mid-19th century, during the Nguyễn dynasty, and became a staple food by the early 20th century. In the 1950s, a distinctly Vietnamese style of sandwich developed in Saigon, becoming a popular street food, also known as bánh mì Sài Gòn ("Saigon sandwich", "Saigon-style banh mi"). Following the Vietnam War, Overseas Vietnamese popularized the  sandwich in countries such as Australia, Canada and the United States. In these countries they are commonly sold in Asian bakeries.

Terminology

It may also be spelled  in northern Vietnam. Taken alone,  means any kind of bread, but it could refer to the Vietnamese baguette, or the sandwich made from it. To distinguish the un-filled bread from the sandwich with fillings, the term  ("plain bread") can be used.

A folk etymology claims that the word  is a corruption of the French , meaning soft, white bread. However,  or its Nôm form  has referred to rice cakes and other pastries since as early as the 13th century, long before French contact.

History
The word , meaning "bread", is attested in Vietnamese as early as the 1830s, in Jean-Louis Taberd's dictionary . The French introduced Vietnam to the baguette, along with other baked goods such as pâté chaud, in the 1860s, at the start of their imperialism in Vietnam. Northern Vietnamese initially called the baguette , literally "Western bánh", while Southern Vietnamese called it , "wheat bánh". Nguyễn Đình Chiểu mentions the baguette in his 1861 poem "". Due to the price of imported wheat at the time, French baguettes and sandwiches were considered a luxury. During World War I, an influx of French soldiers and supplies arrived. At the same time, disruptions of wheat imports led bakers to begin mixing in inexpensive rice flour (which also made the bread fluffier). As a result, it became possible for ordinary Vietnamese to enjoy French staples such as bread. Many shops baked twice a day, because bread tends to go stale quickly in the hot, humid climate of Vietnam. Baguettes were mainly eaten for breakfast with some butter and sugar.

Until the 1950s, sandwiches hewed closely to French tastes, typically a jambon-beurre moistened with a mayonnaise or liver  spread. The 1954 Partition of Vietnam sent over a million migrants from North Vietnam to South Vietnam, transforming Saigon's local cuisine. In 1958,  became one of the first shops to sell . Around this time, another migrant from the North began selling  sandwiches from a basket on a mobylette, and a stand in Gia Định Province (present-day Phú Nhuận District) began selling  sandwiches. Some shops stuffed sandwiches with inexpensive Cheddar cheese, which came from French food aid that migrants from the North had rejected. Vietnamese communities in France also began selling .

After the Fall of Saigon in 1975,  sandwiches became a luxury item once again. During the so-called "subsidy period", state-owned phở eateries often served bread or cold rice as a side dish, leading to the present-day practice of dipping  in phở.

Meanwhile, Vietnamese Americans brought bánh mì sandwiches to cities across the United States. In Northern California,  and his sons are credited with popularizing  among Vietnamese and non-Vietnamese Americans alike through their food truck services provider and their fast-food chain, Lee's Sandwiches, beginning in the 1980s. Sometimes  was likened to local sandwiches. In New Orleans, a "Vietnamese po' boy" recipe won the 2009 award for best po' boy at the annual Oak Street Po-Boy Festival. A restaurant in Philadelphia also sells a similar sandwich, marketed as a "Vietnamese hoagie".

Since the 1970s Vietnamese refugees from the American War in Vietnam arrived in London and were hosted at community centres in areas of London such as De Beauvoir Town eventually founding a string of successful Vietnamese-style canteens in Shoreditch where bánh mì alongside phở, were popularised from the 1990s. 

 sandwiches were featured in the 2002 PBS documentary Sandwiches That You Will Like. The word  was added to the Oxford English Dictionary on 24 March 2011. As of 2017,  is included in about 2% of U.S. restaurant sandwich menus, a nearly fivefold increase from 2013. On March 24, 2020, Google celebrated bánh mì with a Google Doodle.

Ingredients

Bread

A Vietnamese baguette has a thin crust and white, airy crumb. It may consist of both wheat flour and rice flour.

It can also be dipped in condensed milk (see Sữa Ông Thọ).

Fillings

A  sandwich typically consists of one or more meats, accompanying vegetables, and condiments.

Accompanying vegetables typically include fresh cucumber slices, cilantro (leaves of the coriander plant) and pickled carrots and white radishes in shredded form. Common condiments include spicy chili sauce, sliced chilis, Maggi seasoning sauce, and mayonnaise.

Varieties
Many fillings are used. A typical  shop in the United States offers at least 10 varieties.

Other varieties include:

  (shredded pork sandwich) shredded pork or pork skin, doused with fish sauce
  (pork floss sandwich)
  (minced pork meatball sandwich) smashed pork meatballs
  (ham sandwich)
  (sardine sandwich)
  ( sandwich)
  (grilled chicken sandwich)
  (vegetarian sandwich) made with tofu or seitan; in Vietnam, usually made at Buddhist temples during special religious events, but uncommon on the streets
  (fish patty sandwich)
  (margarine or buttered sandwich) margarine / butter and sugar
  (fried egg sandwich) contains fried eggs with onions, sprinkled with soy sauce, sometimes buttered; served for breakfast in Vietnam
  (ice cream sandwich) contains scoops of ice cream topped with crushed peanuts

Nowadays, it is popular with different type of : bánh mì que. Its shape is thinner and longer than a normal one. But it can be fulfilled with different ingredients as normal .

Sandwices similar to Vietnamese  are also found in Lao cuisine called khao chī pate and in Cambodian cuisine called  num pang pâté.

Notable vendors

Lee's Sandwiches, a fast food chain with locations in several states, specializes in Vietnamese sandwiches served on French baguettes (or traditional  at some locations) as well as Western-style sandwiches served on croissants. In New Orleans, Dong Phuong Oriental Bakery is known for the  bread that it distributes to restaurants throughout the city.

Mainstream fast food chains have also incorporated  and other Vietnamese dishes into their portfolios. Yum! Brands operates a chain of  cafés called Bánh Shop. The former Chipotle-owned ShopHouse Southeast Asian Kitchen chain briefly sold . Jack in the Box offers a "–inspired" fried chicken sandwich as part of its Food Truck Series. McDonald's and Paris Baguette locations in Vietnam offer .

See also
 List of sandwiches
 Marraqueta
 Vietnamese cuisine

References

External links

1950s in South Vietnam
Food and drink introduced in the 1950s
French fusion cuisine
Rice breads
Sandwiches
Southeast Asian breads
Street food in Vietnam
Vietnamese fusion cuisine
Vietnamese words and phrases
Vietnamese-American cuisine